Barí is a Chibchan language spoken in Northwestern South America by the Barí (Motilon).

Phonology 
Barí has six vowels: /a, e, i, ɨ, o, u/. All vowels have nasalized forms, and Barí has contrastive nasalization.

References

Bruce Olson. Bruchko. Charisma House, 1977.

External links
 Bari language and the Bari indian tribe at native-languages.org
 Barí (Intercontinental Dictionary Series)

Chibchan languages
Languages of Colombia
Languages of Venezuela